Sammy Davis Jr. Sings the Complete 'Dr. Dolittle' is a 1967 studio album by Sammy Davis Jr., of songs from the 1967 musical Doctor Dolittle.

Track listing
 "My Friend the Doctor" – 2:53
 "Beautiful Things" – 4:46
 "Fabulous Places" – 2:31
 "I've Never Seen Anything Like It" – 2:04
 "Where Are the Words" – 2:53
 "At the Crossroads" – 2:18
 "Doctor Dolittle" – 2:00
 "Something in Your Smile" – 4:08
 "I Think I Like You" – 2:57
 "When I Look in Your Eyes" – 3:10
 "After Today" – 2:23
 "Talk to the Animals" – 2:55

All songs written by Leslie Bricusse.

Personnel 
Recorded June 28 and 29 1967, Olympic Studios Barnes, London:

 Sammy Davis Jr.: vocals
 Marty Paich: arranger, conductor
 Keith Grant: engineer

References

1967 albums
Sammy Davis Jr. albums
Albums arranged by Marty Paich
Reprise Records albums
Children's music albums
Albums conducted by Marty Paich
Doctor Dolittle
Covers albums